Electoral district II (Croatian: II. izborna jedinica) is one of twelve electoral districts of Croatian Parliament.

Boundaries 
Electoral district II consist of:

 eastern part of Zagreb County including cities and municipalities: Bedenica, Brckovljani, Dubrava, Dugo Selo, Farkaševac, Gradec, Preseka, Rakovec, Sveti Ivan Zelina, Vrbovec;
 whole Koprivnica-Križevci County;
 whole Bjelovar-Bilogora County;
 eastern part of City of Zagreb including city districts and streets: Adamovec, Belovar, Blaguša, Budenec, Cerje-Sesvete, Dobrodol, Drenčec, Dubec, Dumovec, Đurđekovec, Gajec, Gajišće, Glavnica Donja, Glavnica Gornja, Glavničica, Goranec, Jelkovec, Jesenovec, Kašina, Kašinska Sopnica, Kobiljak, Kučilovina, Kućanec, Luka Sesvete, Lužan, Markovo Polje, Moravče, Novo Brestje, Paruževina, Planina Donja, Planina Gornja, Popovec, Prekvršje, Prepuštovec, Sesvete-Centar, Sesvetska Sela, Sesvetska Selnica, Sesvetska Sopnica, Soblinec, Staro Brestje, Šašinovec, Šija Vrh, Šimunčevec, Vuger Selo, Vugrovec Donji, Vugrovec Gornji, Vurnovec, Žerjavinec and settlements in Dubrava: Trnovčica, Studentski Grad and Poljanice; Granešina, Dankovec, Miroševac, Oporovec, Granešinski Novaki, Zeleni Brijeg, Čulinec, Stari Retkovec, Klaka, Dubrava-središte, Gornja Dubrava, Ivan Mažuranić, Novi Retkovec, Donja Dubrava, 30. svibnja 1990., Čučerje, Branovec-Jalšovec, Novoselec.

Election

2000 Elections 
 

SDP - HSLS
 Dražen Budiša
 Đurđa Adlešić
 Gordana Sobol
 Franjo Kučar
 Stjepan Henezi
 Ivo Čović
 Mladen Godek

HDZ
 Ljerka Mintas-Hodak
 Ivić Pašalić
 Đuro Njavro
 Karmela Caparin

HSS - LS - HNS
 Zlatko Tomčić
 Željko Ledinski
 Ivan Kolar

2003 Elections 
 

HDZ
 Andrija Hebrang
 Gordan Jandroković
 Ivana Sušec-Trakoštanec
 Damir Sesvečan
 Stjepan Bačić
 Karmela Caparin

SDP - LIBRA
 Milan Bandić
 Zvonimir Mršić
 Jozo Radoš
 Ivica Pančić

HSS
 Zlatko Tomčić
 Josip Friščić

HSP
 Pero Kovačević

HSLS - DC
 Đurđa Adlešić

2007 Elections 
 

SDP
 Milan Bandić
 Zvonimir Mršić
 Boris Šprem
 Marija Lugarić
 Ivica Pančić
 Vesna Škulić

HDZ
 Andrija Hebrang
 Damir Polančec
 Gordan Jandroković
 Damir Sesvečan
 Bianca Matković

HSS - HSLS
 Josip Friščić
 Đurđa Adlešić
 Damir Bajs

2011 Elections 
 

SDP - HNS - IDS - HSU
 Zvonimir Mršić
 Boris Šprem
 Gordan Maras
 Dragica Zgrebec
 Željko Šemper
 Darko Ledinski
 Marija Lugarić
 Vedran Babić

HDZ
 Đuro Popijač
 Davorin Mlakar
 Martina Banić
 Stjepan Milinković

HSS
 Josip Friščić

HL SR
 Zlatko Tušak

2015 Elections 

HDZ - HSS - HSP AS - BUZ - HSLS - HRAST - HDS - ZDS
 Miroslav Tuđman
 Branko Hrg
 Andrija Mikulić
 Miro Kovač
 Darko Sobota
 Dario Hrebak

SDP - HNS - HSU - HL SR - A-HSS - ZS
 Josip Leko
 Anka Mrak-Taritaš
 Gordan Maras
 Vedran Babić
 Gordana Sobol

Most
 Ivan Lovrinović
 Ljubica Ambrušec

BM365 - DPS - DSŽ - HES - HRS - HSZ - ID - MS - NSH - Novi val - SU - UDU - Zeleni - ZS
 Milan Bandić

2016 Elections 
 

HDZ - HSLS
 Zlatko Hasanbegović
 Ivana Maletić
 Milijan Brkić
 Andrija Mikulić
 Branko Hrg
 Miro Totgergeli

SDP - HNS - HSS - HSU
 Anka Mrak-Taritaš
 Gordan Maras
 Stjepan Kožić
 Vedran Babić
 Kažimir Varda

BM365 - NS R - Novi val - HSS SR - BUZ
 Milan Bandić

Most
 Slaven Dobrović

ŽZ - PH - AM - HDSS - Abeceda
 Ivan Lovrinović

2020 Elections 
 

HDZ - HSLS
 Gordan Jandroković
 Dario Hrebak
 Miroslav Tuđman
 Ante Deur
 Gordan Grlić Radman
 Miro Totgergeli

SDP - HSS - HSU - SNAGA - GLAS - IDS - PGS
 Rajko Ostojić
 Mišel Jakšić
 Damir Bajs
 Vesna Nađ

DP - HS - BLOK - HKS - HRAST - SU - ZL
 Miroslav Škoro
 Milan Vrkljan

Most
 Nino Raspudić

Možemo - ZJN - NL - RF - ORAH - ZG
 Vili Matula

References 

Electoral districts in Croatia